Kudrin is a Russian masculine surname, its feminine counterpart is Kudrina. It may refer to
Alexei Kudrin (born 1960), Russian politician
Olga Kudrina (c. 1890–1944), shamaness of Inner Mongolia
Pavel Kudrin (born 1983), Russian football player
Sergey Kudrin (born 1959), American chess grandmaster 

Russian-language surnames